Joseph-Alexandre Crevier (1824–1889) was a French-Canadian doctor who discovered the microbial transmission of cholera as well as a powerful remedy. He was also a naturalist.

References
Google Books - Histoire de la littérature canadienne
 Biography at the Dictionary of Canadian Biography Online

19th-century Canadian physicians
Canadian naturalists
1824 births
1889 deaths